Deep Heat may refer to:
 Deep Heat (heat rub)
 Deep Heat (compilation album), a 1989 album from Telstar Records
 Deep Heat (Oh Mercy album), 2012
 A form of dielectric heating